James Henry Toole (October 28, 1824 – October 15, 1884) served four terms as mayor of Tucson, Arizona. The first two terms were 1873 and 1874. The second two terms were 1878 and 1879.

Early years
Toole was born to Thomas and Mary Toole in New Rochelle, New York on October 28, 1824, the youngest of 13 children. Toole accompanied his father to New Orleans, Louisiana working as a merchant. Toole served in the Louisiana state militia as a private in an artillery company. In 1849 Toole joined the California Gold Rush, becoming a miner in Placer County, California.

Military service
On the onset of the American Civil War, Toole enlisted into the US Army on October 14, 1861 in Placerville, California and mustered in as a second lieutenant of Company G, 5th Regiment California Volunteer Infantry at Camp Union (California) on November 26, 1861.  Toole marched with the infantry to Tucson in April 1862.
Toole served as acting Assistant Quartermaster and Commissary in Tucson from May 30, 1862 to January 9, 1863. Toole was promoted to first lieutenant and became Regimental Quartermaster at Tucson, January 10, 1863.
Toole transferred to Company D at Tucson May 19, 1863.  Toole transferred to Company C, 1st California Veteran Infantry Battalion at Las Cruces, New Mexico November 28, 1864.  On April 5, 1865 Toole was honorably discharged at Franklin in El Paso, Texas.

Post Civil War
Upon discharge from the army, Toole returned to Tucson, Arizona, becoming one of the most important businessmen of southern Arizona.

On September 7, 1868, Toole was appointed adjutant general of the Territory of Arizona with the rank of lieutenant colonel.  He resigned the position shortly after on December 15, 1868.

On October 3, 1870 Governor Anson P. K. Safford appointed Toole to the Pima County Board of Supervisors to fill the vacancy created by the resignation of E. N. Fish.

Toole served two one year terms as Mayor of the village of Tucson 1873 and 1874, and again two terms as mayor 1878 and 1879.

Named after James Toole

Toole Avenue in downtown Tucson was named in 1879 in honor of James Toole.

References

External links
 

1824 births
1884 deaths
Politicians from New Rochelle, New York
People of the California Gold Rush
People of California in the American Civil War
County supervisors in Arizona
Mayors of Tucson, Arizona
American merchants
Arizona pioneers
19th-century American politicians
19th-century American businesspeople